There have been many statutes known as Militia Act.

 The King's Sole Right over the Militia Act 1661, England
 Militia Act of 1662, England, defining lord-lieutenants powers to raise militia 
 Militia Act of 1757, creating a militia to defend Britain during the Seven Years' War, leading to the creation of The Poker Club in Scotland
 Militia Act of 1786, a 1786 Act of the Parliament of Great Britain 
 Militia Acts of 1792 (Uniform Militia Act), two acts passed by the United States Federal government
 Militia Act of 1793
 Militia Act 1797, to create a uniform Scottish militia
 Militia Act of 1808, United States
 Militia Act of 1855, Canada
 Militia Act of 1862, United States
 Militia Act of 1903 (Dick Act), United States
 Militia Act 1745, Kingdom of Great Britain
 Militia Act 1802, United Kingdom
 Militia Act of 1803, an 1803 Act of the Parliament of the United Kingdom
 Militia Act of 1845, to create the Nelson Battalion of Militia in New Zealand
 Militia Act of 1882, United Kingdom, amended by the Reserve Forces and Militia Act 1898

See also 
 Scottish Militia Bill (1708)